The Five Wisdoms are five kinds of wisdoms which appear when the mind is purified of the five disturbing emotions and the natural mind appears. All of those five wisdoms are represented by one of the five buddha-families.

Meaning and translations
Pañca-jñāna is rendered in English as: "five wisdoms," "five awarenesses," or "five pristine cognitions."

Interpretations
The Five Wisdoms are:
 Tathatā-jñāna, the wisdom of Suchness or Dharmadhatu, "the bare non-conceptualizing awareness" of Śūnyatā, the universal substrate of the other four jñāna;
 Ādarśa-jñāna, the wisdom of "Mirror-like Awareness", "devoid of all dualistic thought and ever united with its 'content' as a mirror is with its reflections"; This type of wisdom is a transformation of the eighth consciousness, the Alayavijnana. 
 Samatā-jñāna, the wisdom of the "Awareness of Sameness", which perceives the sameness, the commonality of  dharmas or phenomena. This kind of wisdom is a transformation of the seventh consciousness, the Klistamanas. Through this wisdom, a Buddha sees beyond all superficial differentiations and perceives the fundamental of all things as Śūnyatā or emptiness. Such undifferentiation gives rise to equality for all beings. Hence, it is also understood as the wisdom of equality or impartiality.
 , the wisdom of "Investigative Awareness", that perceives the specificity, the uniqueness of dharmas. This type of wisdom is a transformation of the sixth consciousness, and is also known as the wisdom of specific knowledge or sublime investigation.
 , the wisdom of "Accomplishing Activities", the awareness that "spontaneously carries out all that has to be done for the welfare of beings, manifesting itself in all directions". This type of wisdom is created through the transformation of the five sensory consciousness.

The Five Wisdoms "emerge through a transformation (parāvṛtti) of the eight consciousnesses at the moment of enlightenment".

Five Dhyani Buddhas

The idea of the Five Wisdoms "underwent a considerable development" within Tibetan Buddhism where they are "symbolized or embodied" in the Five Dhyani Buddhas.

According to Bönpo teacher Tenzin Wangyal, the Five Pure Lights become the Five Poisons if we remain deluded, or the Five Wisdoms and the Five Buddha Families if we recognize their purity.

The Five Wisdoms, and the accompanying Five Buddhas, are represented in Tibetan Buddhism by the "symbolic bone ornaments". The Hevajra Tantra associates the Symbolic Bone Ornaments directly with the Five Wisdoms:
 the 'wheel-like' (Tib.: '') 'crown ornament' (sometimes called 'crown jewel') (Tib.: gtsug gi nor bu), symbolic of Akshobhya and 'mirror-like pristine awareness' (Ādarśa-jñāna);
 'earrings' represent of Amitabha and pristine awareness of discernment (Pratyavekṣaṇa-jñāna);
 'necklace' symbolizing Ratnasambhava and pristine awareness of total sameness (Samatā-jñāna);
 'bracelets' and 'anklets' (Tib.: gdu bu) as symbolic of Vairochana and pristine awareness of the ultimate dimension of phenomena (Tathatā-jñāna);
 'girdle' symbolizing Amoghasiddhi and the accomplishing pristine awareness (Kṛty-anuṣṭhāna-jñāna);
The additional ornament spoken of in various texts related to Hevajra is ash from a cremation ground smeared on the body (Tib.: thal chen).

See also
 Four Dharmadhātu
 Four ways of knowing
 Achintya Bheda Abheda
 Darśana
 Dhyani Buddhas
 Five Powers
 Mahabhuta
 Pancamakara
 Pancatattva

Notes

References

Sources

Published sources

 
 
 Thrangu Rinpoche (author) & Peter Roberts (translator) (1998). The Five Buddha Families and The Eight Consciousnesses.  Boulder, CO, USA: Published by the Namo Buddha Seminar. Source:  (accessed: November 22, 2007)

Web-sources

External links
The Five Wisdoms: Talk five of six on the Buddhist Wisdom teachings. (transcribed talk), by FWBO's Ratnaghosa (accessed: Thursday, November 22, 2007)

Philosophy of mind
Hindu philosophical concepts
Metaphors
Tibetan Buddhist philosophical concepts
Hypnosis
Consciousness studies
Spirituality
Meditation
Mind–body interventions
Religion articles needing expert attention